Hatsukaichi Station is a railway station on the Sanyō Main Line in Hatsukaichi, Hiroshima, operated by West Japan Railway Company (JR West).

Platforms

Connecting lines

JR
█ Sanyō Main Line
Rapid Service
non-stop
Local
Itsukaichi Station — Hatsukaichi Station — Miyauchikushido Station

Hiroden
█ Miyajima Line
Line #2
Sanyo-joshidai-mae — Hiroden-hatsukaichi — Hatsukaichi-shiyakusyo-mae
Hiroden-hatsukaichi Station is located to the south from JR Hatsukaichi Station, 3 minutes walk from the station.

History
Opened on September 25, 1897.

See also

 List of railway stations in Japan

External links

  

Sanyō Main Line
Hiroshima City Network
Railway stations in Japan opened in 1897